The following is a timeline of the history of the city of Monrovia, Liberia.

19th century

 1822
 April: Settlement of Christopolis established by the American Colonization Society in Pepper Coast area.
 Providence Baptist Church founded.
 1824 - Settlement renamed "Monrovia" named after United States president James Monroe.
 1826 - Liberia Herald newspaper begins publication.
 1839 - Monrovia Seminary founded.
 1847
 June 25: Constitutional Convention held in Monrovia to discuss creation of the state of Liberia.
 July 26: Monrovia becomes part of newly formed Republic of Liberia.
 October 5: First Liberian general election held.
 Monrovia becomes seat of newly formed Montserrado County.
 1853 - Photographer Augustus Washington in business.
 1862 - Supreme Court building constructed.
 1863
 Liberia College opens.
 Trinity Church consecrated.
 1867 - Masonic Order of Liberia organized in Monrovia.
 1872 - January 1: Inauguration of Liberian president Joseph Roberts (second term).
 1890s -  built.
 1892 - Arthur Barclay becomes mayor.

20th century
 1904 - College of West Africa active.
 1918 - Battle of Monrovia.
 1920 - Population: 6,000 (estimate).
 1940s - West Point settlement formed.
 1940 - Population: 12,000.
 1943 - Invincible Eleven football club formed.
 1945 - Gbarnga-Monrovia highway constructed.
 1947 -  erected.
 1948 - Freeport of Monrovia begins operating on nearby Bushrod Island.
 1951
 Liberia Chamber of Commerce headquartered in city.
 University of Liberia active.
 1954
 University's Louis Arthur Grimes School of Law opens.
 Monrovia Elementary School built.(de)
 1956 - Nathan C. Ross becomes mayor.
 1958 - Capitol building constructed.
 1960 - Ducor Hotel in business.
 1961 - September: Labor strike held.
 1962
 Population: 80,992.
 1964 
 Executive Mansion (presidential residence) built.
 National Cultural Centre created in nearby Kendeja, Paynesville.
 1965 - Temple of Justice built.
 1970s -  built over Saint Paul River.
 1970 - Population: 96,226.
 1971 - John F. Kennedy Medical Center opens.
 1974 - Seat of Montserrado County moved from Monrovia to Bensonville.
 1976 - People's Bridge built over Mesurado River.
 1977 - Liberian Center for National Documents and Records headquartered in Monrovia.
 1979
 July: Organisation of African Unity meeting held at Hotel Africa in nearby Virginia.
 "Civil unrest."
 1980
 April 12: 1980 Liberian coup d'état; president Tolbert assassinated in the Presidential Palace. Subsequent unrest occurs.
 Monrovia Black Star FC (football club) formed.
 1981 - Liberian Observer newspaper begins publication.
 1984 - Population: 421,053.
 1986 - Samuel Kanyon Doe Sports Complex opens.
 1990
 May 13:  besieged on Capitol Hill during the First Liberian Civil War.
 July: Independent National Patriotic Front of Liberia "seized control in part of the capital."
 July:  at St. Peter's Lutheran church in Sinkor.
 August 24: Peacekeeping forces of Economic Community of West African States Monitoring Group begin operating.
 September 9: Assassination of president Doe.
 1997 - STAR radio begins broadcasting.
 1998 - 1998 Monrovia clashes.
 1999 -  erected on Broad Street.
 2000 - Daily Talk news chalkboard launched.

21st century
 2001 - Ophelia Hoff Saytumah becomes mayor.
 2003
 April: Women of Liberia Mass Action for Peace begins demonstrating.
 July 18–August 14: Siege of Monrovia occurs during the Second Liberian Civil War.
 2004 - October: "Riots in Monrovia."
 2006 - July: Government "switches on generator-powered street lights in the capital, which has been without electricity for 15 years."
 2008 - Population: 970,824 urban agglomeration.
 2009 - Mary Broh becomes mayor.
 2011 -  built.
 2012 - Coconut Plantation settlement razed.
 2013 - Henry Reed Cooper becomes mayor.
 2014
 Ebola virus epidemic in Liberia occurs.
 Clara Doe-Mvogo becomes mayor.
2015 - George M. Weah becomes Senator of Montserrado County. 
2017 - George M. Weah elected president. 
2018 - First Presidential transition occurred since 1944.

See also
 Monrovia history
 List of mayors of Monrovia
 History of Liberia

References

This article incorporates information from the German Wikipedia.

Bibliography

  (written in 1870s-1880s). 1890 German edition

External links

  (Bibliography)
  (Bibliography)
  (Bibliography)
 Items related to Monrovia, various dates (via Europeana) (Images, etc.)
 Items related to Monrovia, various dates (via Digital Public Library of America) (Images, etc.)
 
 U.S. Library of Congress, Prints & Photographs division. Images related to Monrovia

Monrovia
Monrovia
History of Liberia
Years in Liberia
Liberia-related lists
Monrovia